The 1988 Ebel German Open was a men's tennis tournament that was part of the 1988 Nabisco Grand Prix circuit. It was the 79th edition of the event and was played on outdoor clay courts at the Am Rothenbaum in Hamburg, West Germany from 25 April until 1 May 1988. Second-seeded Kent Carlsson won the singles title.

Finals

Singles
 Kent Carlsson defeated  Henri Leconte 6–2, 6–1, 6–4
 It was Carlsson's 1st singles title of the year and the 6th of his career.

Doubles
 Darren Cahill /  Laurie Warder defeated  Rick Leach /  Jim Pugh 6–0, 5–7, 6–4

References

External links
   
 ATP tournament profile
 ITF tournament editions details

German Open
Hamburg European Open
1988 in West German sport
German